The Maldives national women's cricket team is the team that represents Maldives in international women's cricket. In April 2018, the International Cricket Council (ICC) granted full Women's Twenty20 International (WT20I) status to all its members. Therefore, every Twenty20 match played between Maldives women and other ICC members since 1 July 2018 is a full WT20I.

The team played its first WT20I matches during the 2019 South Asian Games in December 2019. In the bronze medal play-off match, the Maldives were dismissed for just eight runs, to record the second lowest total in a WT20I match. Only one run came from the bat, with the other seven runs coming from wides. Nine cricketers were dismissed without scoring. Earlier in the tournament, the Maldives lost to Bangladesh by 249 runs, with the Maldives bowled out for just six runs in their innings.

Records and Statistics 

International Match Summary — Nepal Women
 
Last updated 7 December 2019

Twenty20 International 

T20I record versus other nations

Records complete to WT20I #810. Last updated 7 December 2019.

See also
 List of Maldives women Twenty20 International cricketers

References

Women's
Women's national cricket teams
Cricket